Ain't Nobody Like You may refer to:
 "Ain't Nobody Like You" (Miki Howard song), 1992
 "Ain't Nobody Like You" (Patricia Conroy song), 1999
 "Ain't Nobody Like You", a 1979 song from Numbers (Rufus album)
 "Ain't Nobody Like You", by Baker Boy featuring Jerome Farah, from the 2021 album Gela
 Ain't Nobody Like You EP, a 2011 EP by Sincere; see Wretch 32 discography#Guest appearances

See also
 Nobody Like You (disambiguation)